Jorge Moreau (born 1 February 1908, date of death unknown) was an Argentine swimmer. He competed in the men's 4 × 200 metre freestyle relay event at the 1924 Summer Olympics and the water polo tournament at the 1928 Summer Olympics.

References

External links
 

1908 births
Year of death missing
Argentine male swimmers
Argentine male water polo players
Olympic swimmers of Argentina
Olympic water polo players of Argentina
Swimmers at the 1924 Summer Olympics
Water polo players at the 1928 Summer Olympics
Swimmers from Buenos Aires